Carlingford railway station was a railway station in Sydney, Australia. It opened in 1896 and was the terminus of the Carlingford line, which served the suburb of Carlingford and was served by Sydney Trains T6 Carlingford line services. The Carlingford railway line was closed on 5 January 2020 with the station demolished in May 2020.

History
Carlingford station was built as the terminus of a new privately owned railway from Rosehill. The Cumberland Argus and Fruitgrowers' Advocate of 12 January 1895 described the plans for the station:

The station opened on 20 April 1896 as Pennant Hills, but the line was never used, as the owner had got into financial difficulty. Pennant Hills was supposed to be a temporary terminus, as it was originally intended to extend the line to Dural. The initial section of line was eventually taken over and upgraded by the government. It opened for traffic on 1 August 1901 and the Pennant Hills station was renamed Carlingford. After the government took control of the line, it directed the Public Works Committee to conduct an investigation into the value of the Dural extension. The committee ultimately decided not to support construction of the extension.

The Carlingford Produce Store is located adjacent to the station. It included facilities to load grain onto railway wagons. Some of this infrastructure is still extant today. A large amount of land lies behind the station, originally reserved for future extensions of the line.

The brick building on the platform was built in 1978 after the original steam era structure was destroyed by fire.

Parramatta Rail Link
A major development of Carlingford station – and the Carlingford line –  was proposed as part of the Parramatta to Chatswood Rail Link project. The Epping to Parramatta section of the project was postponed indefinitely in 2003 by then-New South Wales Transport Minister Michael Costa citing a lack of projected passenger numbers and economic viability.
	 
However, on 11 August 2010, the federal Labor Party promised $2.6 billion towards a revival of the project, as part of the party's successful campaign to retain government at that year's election. Carlingford would have been rebuilt as an underground station. Work was due to start in 2011, with a prospected 2017 finish, but the NSW Liberal Government cancelled the project, instead requesting that Federal funding be diverted to an upgrade of the Pacific Highway. The Federal Government responded by revoking the funding altogether.

Platforms & services
Carlingford station had the following services:

Transport links
Hillsbus operated one route via Carlingford station:
625: Parramatta station to Pennant Hills station

State Transit operated three routes via Carlingford station:
513: to Meadowbank wharf (weekdays only)
546: Parramatta station to Epping
550 Parramatta station to Macquarie Park

Carlingford station was served by one NightRide route:
N61: to Town Hall station

References

External links

Carlingford station details Transport for NSW

Disused railway stations in Sydney
Railway stations closed in 2020
Railway stations in Australia opened in 1896
2020 disestablishments in Australia
City of Parramatta